Alicellidae is a family of amphipod crustaceans, which live as scavengers in the deep sea (at depths of ), often in association with hydrothermal vents. The family includes the following genera:
Alicella Chevreux, 1899
Apotectonia Barnard & Ingram, 1990
Diatectonia Barnard & Ingram, 1990
Paralicella Chevreux, 1908
Tectovalopsis Barnard & Ingram, 1990
Transtectonia Barnard & Ingram, 1990
Civifractura

References

Gammaridea
Crustacean families